Consairway (also Consairway Division or Consolidated Airway) was an American civilian wartime airline created in late-1941 as a subsidiary of the Consolidated Vultee Aircraft Corporation. The airline worked under contract to the United States Air Corps Ferrying Command, primarily for supplying the South West Pacific theatre of World War II. Its very first flights, starting April 23, 1942, however, were Lend-Lease deliveries of American-built aircraft to Great Britain and the Netherlands.

The airline performed hundreds of missions delivering munitions and personnel; and supporting USO activities from 1942 to 1945, including transporting passengers such as Bob Hope, Joe E. Brown and Eleanor Roosevelt. Consairway originally operated out of San Diego but then moved to Fairfield-Suisun Army Air Base in 1943. The airline operated land-based aircraft, as opposed to similar airlines operating flying boats, out of Hickam Field, Guam, Guadalcanal, Australia and New Guinea.

During its peak in 1943, the airline had 800 employees and operated twice-weekly flights to the South West Pacific. Consairway was reported to have flown more than 101 million ton-miles of cargo and 299 million passenger miles by its closing in 1945.

The airline flew the LB-30 Liberator II, Consolidated C-87 Liberator Express and Consolidated B-24 Liberator bomber, as well as a converted XB-24B that was used as a luxury airliner for the United States Army Air Forces.

In 1992, the civilian employees who had worked overseas for Consairway between December 14, 1941, and August 14, 1945, received status and benefits as military veterans under the Veterans Benefits Administration.

See also 
 List of defunct airlines of the United States

References

Air Transport Command
Airlines established in 1941
Airlines disestablished in 1945
Defunct airlines of the United States
South West Pacific theatre of World War II